Lucie Grolichová (born 26 January 1978 in Prague) is a Czech modern pentathlete. She is a six-time medalist (two golds and four bronzes) at the World Championships.

Grolichova qualified for the 2008 Summer Olympics in Beijing, where she competed as a lone female athlete in women's modern pentathlon. During the competition, Grolichova made a strong performance in the early rounds, with fair scores in pistol shooting and freestyle swimming, and a third-place finish in a one-touch épée fencing. She struggled to maintain her position in show jumping, when her horse Ching Ching repeatedly knocked off numerous obstacles.  Grolichova finished the event with cross-country running in sixteenth place, for a total score of 5,372 points.

In 2006 Grolichova won the World Cup in Moscow. In 2009, Grolichova made her breakthrough season in the international scene, when she won two gold medals for the relay event, along with her teammates Natálie Dianová and Sylvie Cerna, at the European Championships in Leipzig, Germany, and consequently, at the World Championships in London, England.

References

External links
  (archived page from Pentathlon.org)
 NBC 2008 Olympics profile

1978 births
Living people
Czech female modern pentathletes
Olympic modern pentathletes of the Czech Republic
Modern pentathletes at the 2008 Summer Olympics
World Modern Pentathlon Championships medalists
Sportspeople from Prague